Certified Air Raid Material is the second studio album by American record producer Edit. It was released on Alpha Pup Records on September 18, 2007. It features guest appearances from The Grouch, Abstract Rude, TTC, Busdriver, and D-Styles.

Reception 

Alan Ranta of Tiny Mix Tapes gave the album 4 stars out of 5 and described it as "[Edit's] unite-after-war album, using the unmistakable aggression of U.S. club hip-hop beats as a reflection of the world's continually spiraling political climate." Matt Earp of XLR8R gave the album an 8 out of 10, calling it "one of the best party albums of the year".

On November 5, 2007, the title track was listed by KEXP-FM as the "Song of the Day".

Track listing

References

External links 
 
 

2007 albums
Alpha Pup Records albums
Alternative hip hop albums by American artists
Electronic albums by American artists